Arno Kozelsky (born 1 November 1981) is an Austrian footballer, currently playing for SKN St. Pölten.

Club career
Kozelsky played for lower league sides Liebenfels and Bleiburg before joining Austrian Football Bundesliga outfit FC Kärnten for the second half of the 2002–2003 season. In 2004, he signed for DSV Leoben. He impressed in a trial with Hibernian in May 2007, and joined Hibernian at their pre-season training camp to try to get a contract with the club.
After an unsuccessful bid at training camp with Hibernian, he was immediately resigned by Austrian club DSV Leoben in 2007. In summer 2008 he moved to promoted Kapfenberg.

External links
Player profile - Kapfenberger SV

References

1981 births
Living people
Association football forwards
Austrian footballers
SVG Bleiburg players
FC Kärnten players
DSV Leoben players
Kapfenberger SV players
SKN St. Pölten players
Austrian Football Bundesliga players